The Johnson-Campbell House is a historic house in Columbus, Ohio, United States. The house was built in 1906 and was listed on the National Register of Historic Places in 1986. The Johnson-Campbell House was built at a time when East Broad Street was a tree-lined avenue featuring the most ornate houses in Columbus; the house reflects the character of the area at the time.

The house was built in 1906 and designed with Georgian influences by Richards, McCarty & Bulford. It was built for Edward Johnson, president of the Lorain Coal & Dock Co. His family occupied the house until 1912, after which it held the Joseph C. Campbell family, until 1943.

See also
 National Register of Historic Places listings in Columbus, Ohio

References

External links

Houses completed in 1906
National Register of Historic Places in Columbus, Ohio
Houses in Columbus, Ohio
Houses on the National Register of Historic Places in Ohio
Broad Street (Columbus, Ohio)